Texas Family Magazine is a bi-monthly American magazine published in Sugar Land, Texas.  It is a self-styled "parenting handbook" with content focused on parenting, health, education and fashion.  Some of the notable past covers of Texas Family have included Debbie and Roger Clemens, Joel and Victoria Osteen, Dana Vollmer, Ricardo Chavira, Laura Miller, and Whitney Ott.

References

External links
 myspace.com/txfammag - Official MySpace Site
 texasfamilyfoundation.org - Texas Family Foundation

Lifestyle magazines published in the United States
Bimonthly magazines published in the United States
Magazines published in Texas
Magazines established in 2005
Parenting magazines